Gerulfus Kherubim Pareira S.D.V. (born 26 September 1941) is an Indonesian Roman Catholic bishop.

Biography
On 15 August 1970 Pareira was accepted as a member of the society of the divine word. The following week on 22 August 1970 he was ordained a priest. On  21 December 1985 it was announced that Pareira had been chosen as the new bishop of the Diocese of  Weetebula. He was ordained bishop on 25 April 1986, by Gregorius Manteiro, then bishop of Rueteng, and co-consecrated by Anton Pain Ratu, then bishop of Atambua, and Eduardus Sangsun, then bishop of Ruteng. On 19 January 2008 Pareira was installed as the new bishop of the Diocese of Maumere.

In 2011 Pareira celebrated his 50 monastic life, 40 years as a priest and 25 years as a bishop.

On 26 September 2016, the Vatican accepted Pareira's letter of resignation, which he had submitted as all bishops are required to do once they turn 75. On 14 July 2018, Pareira officially retired as the bishop of Maumere at the age of 76.

References

External links

1941 births
Living people
People from East Nusa Tenggara
20th-century Roman Catholic bishops in Indonesia
21st-century Roman Catholic bishops in Indonesia
Divine Word Missionaries Order